The Sign is a 1993 album by Swedish pop group Ace of Base, released as the band's debut album in North America and some Latin American countries by Arista Records. The Sign contains songs from Ace of Base's debut album, Happy Nation (1992) and the new songs "Don't Turn Around", "The Sign", and "Living in Danger" as well as revised versions of "Voulez-Vous Danser" and "Waiting for Magic".

The Sign is listed among the Top 100 Best-selling Albums of All Time by the Recording Industry Association of America (RIAA), with sales in excess of 21 million copies. The album itself earned Arista Records 42 million USD, and was nominated for Best Pop Album at the 1995 Grammy Awards. The Sign was ranked top three on the Billboard 200 chart for 26 consecutive weeks. The album, and the single of the same name, are the only single or album by a Swedish act to rank number one on Billboards annual overall Year-End lists.

Background
The album was intended to be released in the US on 26 October 1993 as Happy Nation. However, their label, Arista Records, delayed the album in order for the band to add two radio-friendly singles. The two additional tracks were: "The Sign" and "Living in Danger".  The album was eventually released on 23 November 1993. To coincide with the release of The Sign, Happy Nation was re-released in Europe, Mexico, and Australia as Happy Nation (U.S. Version). These releases featured the new tracks and revised versions included on The Sign, as well the new track "Hear Me Calling" and a remix of "Happy Nation".

Commercial performance
The Sign is listed among the Top 100 Best-selling Albums of All Time by the Recording Industry Association of America (RIAA), with sales in excess of 21 million copies. The album itself earned Arista Records 42 million USD, and was nominated for Best Pop Album at the 1995 Grammy Awards. The Sign was ranked top three on the Billboard 200 chart for 26 consecutive weeks. The album, and the single of the same name, are the only single or album by a Swedish act to rank number one on Billboards annual overall Year-End lists.

Track listing

Notes
 signifies rap lyrics
 signifies pre-production

Charts

Weekly charts

Year-end charts

Certifications and sales

Video album
Some songs from the album were also released as an Ace of Base video collection released in the summer of 1994 on VHS video in North America.  Laserdisc editions appeared in Japan as well.

Contents
 All That She Wants
 The Sign
 Don't Turn Around Studio Documentary
 Don't Turn Around
 Living In Danger Studio Documentary
 Happy Nation
 Wheel of Fortune

References

Ace of Base albums
1993 albums
Arista Records albums
Edel-Mega Records albums